Vidas Robadas is the title of a Spanish-language telenovela produced by the Mexican television network TV Azteca. It is internationally known as "Infamia". It stars Carla Hernandez, Andres Palacios, and marks the return of the grand actress, Cristian Bach to the television screen.

Plot

Infamia or Torn Apart a story of love, hate, revenge and the desperation of those locked in its power struggles and haunted by the ghosts from the past. Maria Julia Fernandez Vidal takes up the cause of good against evil, of light against darkness, of the will to live versus the wish to die, of honesty against deception. Antonio, Maria Julia's husband and Jose Enrique her stepson and his wife Isabel all share the darkest secrets about Maria Julia –a woman who divides her time between her work, her love of gambling and a secret love. Unaware that they are twins, Luz and Camila live two separate lives. One lives in the big city whilst the other lives in Izamal a small provincial town and of course their lives are totally different but they are both victims of deceit and lies oblivious to who their real mother is. Luz is a sensitive, kind, generous and responsible young lady with a clear objective in life: to study in order to be able to give abandoned children some hope for the future. Camila, on the other hand was brought up quite differently. Not shown enough love except by her nanny Paula. Camila grew up to be a rather unstable young woman with a petulant and selfish nature. The twins' lives take an unexpected turn as fate makes them both fall in love with Martin Sandoval a charming and ruggedly handsome tycoon. Ambition, arrogance and beauty in the guise of a woman.

Cast

Main casts 
Protagonists
 Christian Bach...María Julia Echeverría de Fernández-Vidal - Main Villain  / Maria Emilia Echeverría Ruiz
 Carla Hernández...Luz Herrera  / Camila Fernández Vidal - Main Heroine / Secondary Villain
 Andrés Palacios...Martin Sandoval Main Hero
Special participation
 Alma Delfina...Aurora Sandoval
 Pedro Sicard...José Enrique Fernández Vidal (Villain)
 José Alonso...Antonio Fernández Vidal
 Luis Felipe Tovar...Ángel Cordero (Villain)
 Martha Cristiana...Isabel Fernández Vidal
 Bernie Paz...Joan Manuel

Secondary casts
 Eduardo Arroyuelo...Marcelo
 Daniel Elbittar...Javier Villafañe (Villano)
 Sergio Bonilla...Juan
 Lupita Sandoval...Saturnina
 Luis Ernesto Franco...Francisco
 Amara Villafuerte...Paula
 Rodolfo Arias...Padre Adolfo
 María José de la Fuente...Lorena
 Victor Civeira...Filiberto
 Paloma Quezada...Rosa Maria
 Luis Alberto López..Pablo
 Julieta Grajales..Nora
 Gabriel Casanova
 Luis Romano
 Ricardo Tico....Pedro Antonio Fernández Vidal (Asesinado por Maria Julia)
 Stefania Gómez
 Paulina Washington
 Mayte Fierro
 Mariana Villegas
 Carlos Padilla
 Andree Ascencio
 David Ortega
 Josefo Rodríguez
 Jorge Aldama
 Daniela Menchaca
 Juan Menchaca
 Juan Fernando Haro
 Raul Adalid
 Angeles Alonso
 Maribel Rodríguez
 Maria Elena Olivares
 Javier Escobar...El Velas (Asesinado por Maria Julia y José Enrique)
 Gabriel Pascual
 Diego Rafel Euan Euan
 Angel Gabriel Euan Euan
 Carmen Delgado

Broadcast

References

2010 telenovelas
2010 Mexican television series debuts
2010 Mexican television series endings
Mexican telenovelas
Spanish-language telenovelas
TV Azteca telenovelas